The Emergency Pharmacy System (EPS) initiative of the United States Department of Veterans Affairs (VA) provides prescriptions to veterans during natural or man-made disasters when VA facilities are damaged, undermanned, or unreachable.

Sources
U.S. Department of Veterans Affairs Press Release, "VA Putting Mobile Pharmacies on the Road," March 18, 2008.

External links
VA Press Release
The Government Accountability Office
House Committee on Veterans' Affairs

American veterans' organizations
Pharmacy organizations in the United States
United States Department of Veterans Affairs